Citrus Valley High School is a high school in the Redlands Unified School District in Redlands, California, located in San Bernardino County. Citrus Valley High School is Redlands' fifth high school in its district, but third conventional public high school in the district. Founded on August 12, 2009.

History

The school was built in two phases, half of the school was built using funds from measure R passed in 2003, and the other half was being built with Measure J passed in 2008. The reason for two measures is because of the rise in construction cost in California. The High school was populated in phases as well. The first graduating class from Citrus Valley High School was the class of 2012. The first graduating class to start as freshmen and finish as seniors graduated in 2013.

Athletics
A variety of sports are offered at Citrus Valley High School. The school joined the Citrus Belt League in 2014. Among those included are Wrestling, boys and girls basketball, football, boys and girls water polo, swimming, tennis, badminton, track and field, golf, baseball, softball, boys and girls volleyball, and cross country. They also have a robotics team that went undefeated in its first regular season during 2013 and was qualified to enter the VEX Robotics World Championship in Anaheim CA.

References

External links
Citrus Valley High School
sbcsun

High schools in San Bernardino County, California
Redlands Unified School District
Public high schools in California
Buildings and structures in Redlands, California
2009 establishments in California